The China Railways FD class of locomotives were 2-10-2 steam locomotives of the Russian FD locomotive type imported from Russia and regauged for use in China.

History
The FD class locomotives were imported from Russia from 1958 to provide main line freight motive power for the Chinese railways. Over 1000 units were acquired and remained in service until 1985.

When imported the class were designated YH (YouHao meaning 'friendship'), but after the breakdown of Sino-Soviet relations during the Cultural Revolution (see Sino–Soviet split) the class were renamed FX (FanXiu meaning 'anti-revisionist'). In 1971 the class were returned to the original designation 'FD' of soviet Russian origin (after Felix Dzerzhinsky).

Preservation
FD number 1227 is preserved at the Shenyang Railway Museum.
FD number 1653 is preserved at the Baotou West Locomotive Depot, Huhhot Railway Bureau.
FD number 1979 is preserved at the Beijing Railway Museum.

See also
Russian locomotive class FD

References

Steam locomotives of China
2-10-2 locomotives
Luhanskteplovoz locomotives
Standard gauge locomotives of China

Freight locomotives